"Deutschland" ("Germany") is a song by German Neue Deutsche Härte band Rammstein. Released as the lead single from their untitled seventh studio album on 28 March 2019, it was their first new music since the song "Mein Land" in 2011.

The song became Rammstein's second No. 1 single in Germany after "Pussy" in 2009. It was also a No. 1 hit in Hungary and Switzerland, reached the top 5 in Austria and Finland, was nominated for the 2019 Kerrang! Award for Best Single.

Music video
The song's music video was directed by Specter Berlin and was released on 28 March 2019 at 18:00 CET, following a 35-second teaser trailer on 26 March. The lengthy music video sparked controversy; its dark, violent, and macabre styletypical of the band's aestheticfeatures various events from German history, including Roman times, the Battle of the Teutoburg Forest, the Middle Ages, witch hunting, the November Revolution, the Golden Twenties, Nazi book burnings, the Hindenburg disaster, the First and Second World Wars, the Holocaust, the Weimar Republic, the Red Army Faction, and the division of the country into West and East Germany; it also features science fiction scenes set in outer space, cannibalism in which people were eating Germania, the personification of Germany, and a bank robbery featuring lead singer Till Lindemann crossdressing as Ulrike Meinhof. German actress Ruby Commey appears as Germania throughout the video. The song also twice uses the line "Deutschland, Deutschland über allen" ("Germany, Germany above everyone") as a reference to "Deutschland, Deutschland über alles" ("Germany, Germany above everything") from the Deutschlandlied.

The ending credits feature a piano version of the band's 2001 single "Sonne"; the introduction features the song called "The Beast" from the Sicario soundtrack by Jóhann Jóhannsson.

Music video symbolism
Regarding the use of the extreme polarities of symbolism involving the depiction of Nazism and the Holocaust, Oxford professor Alexandra Lloyd has stated: "The most obviously shocking scene references the Holocaust and the Nazi period. Four members of the band, in the striped uniforms of camp inmates, wait at the gallows, about to be hanged. They wear the cloth emblems used to identify their ‘crimes’: a pink triangle for homosexual prisoners, a yellow star for Jewish prisoners, a red and yellow star for Jewish political prisoners."

Track listing

Charts

Weekly charts

Year-end charts

Certifications

Release history

References

External links
 Rammstein "Deutschland" music video
 

2019 singles
German-language songs
Music video controversies
Number-one singles in Germany
Number-one singles in Hungary
Number-one singles in Switzerland
Rammstein songs
Songs about Germany
Works about the Holocaust
Anti-fascist music
Songs written by Till Lindemann
Songs written by Paul Landers
Songs written by Richard Z. Kruspe
Songs written by Christian Lorenz
Songs written by Oliver Riedel
Songs written by Christoph Schneider
Universal Music Group singles